Triops is a genus of small crustaceans in the order Notostraca (tadpole shrimp). The long-lasting resting eggs of several species of Triops are commonly sold in kits as a pet. The animals hatch upon contact with fresh water. Most adult-stage Triops have a life expectancy of up to 90 days and can tolerate a pH range of 6 to 10. In nature, they often inhabit temporary pools.

Relatives and fossil record 
The genus Triops can be distinguished from the only other living genus of Notostraca, Lepidurus, by the form of the telson (the end of its 'tail'), which bears only a pair of long, thin caudal extensions in Triops, while Lepidurus also bears a central platelike process. Only 24 hours after hatching they already resemble miniature versions of the adult form.

Triops are sometimes called "living fossils", since fossils that have been attributed to this genus have been found in rocks hundreds of millions of years old. However, careful analysis of these fossils cannot definitively assign these specimens to Triops. Molecular clock estimates suggest that Triops split from Lepidurus during the Triassic or Jurassic, between 152.3–233.5 million years ago. The earliest diverging lineages of living Triops are found in areas that are part of the former supercontinent Gondwana, suggesting Triops originated in Gondwana.

Triops can be found in Africa, Australia, Asia, South America, Europe (including Great Britain), and in some parts of North America where the climate is right. Some eggs stay unhatched from the previous group and hatch when rain soaks the area. Triops are often found in vernal pools.

Life cycle 
Most species reproduce sexually, but some populations are dominated by hermaphrodites which produce internally fertilised eggs. Reproduction in T. cancriformis varies with latitude, with sexual reproduction dominating in the south of its range, and parthenogenesis dominating in the north.

The diapause also prevents the eggs from hatching too soon after rain; the pool must fill with enough water for the dormancy to be broken.

Taxonomy 

The name Triops comes from the Greek  meaning "three" and  meaning "eye". The head of T. longicaudatus bears a pair of dorsal compound eyes that lie close to each other and are nearly fused together. The compound eyes are generally sessile (not stalked). In addition, there is a naupliar ocellus (the "third eye") between them. The compound eyes are on the surface of the head, but the ocellus is deep within the head. All the eyes, however, are easily visible through the shell covering of the head.

Franz von Paula Schrank was the first author to use the genus name Triops, coining it in his 1803 work on the fauna of Bavaria. He collected and described specimens from the same locality in Regensburg from which Schäffer, another naturalist who had studied the Notostraca, obtained his specimens in the 1750s. However, other authors, starting with Louis Augustin Guillaume Bosc, had adopted the genus name Apus for the organisms Schrank had named Triops

Ludwig Keilhack used the genus name Triops in his 1909 field identification key of the freshwater fauna of Germany. He suggested that the genus name Apus be replaced by Triops Schrank since an avian genus had already been described by Giovanni Antonio Scopoli under the name Apus. However, Robert Gurney preferred the name Apus Schäffer. He suggested that the name '…Triops Schrank, may be returned to the obscurity from which it was unearthed'. This controversy continued and was not resolved until the 1950s.

In his 1955 taxonomic review of the Notostraca, Alan R. Longhurst supported Keilhack's genus name Triops over Apus. Longhurst provided historical evidence to support this position. The International Commission on Zoological Nomenclature (ICZN) followed Longhurst in their 1958 ruling on the usage and origin of the genus names Triops and Apus. They rejected the genus name Apus and instead recognized the genus name Triops Schrank, 1803 (ICZN name no. 1246).

Although the taxonomy of the genus has not been reviewed since 1955, the following species are recognised:
 Triops australiensis (Spencer & Hall, 1895)
 Triops baeticus Korn, 2010
 Triops cancriformis (Bosc, 1801)
 Triops emeritensis Korn & Pérez-Bote, 2010
 Triops gadensis Korn & García-de-Lomas, 2010
 Triops granarius (Lucas, 1864)
 Triops longicaudatus (LeConte, 1846)
 Triops mauritanicus Ghigi, 1921
 Triops newberryi Thomas, 1921
 Triops vicentinus Korn, Machado, Cristo & Cancela da Fonseca, 2010

T. mauritanicus was considered a subspecies of T. cancriformis by Longhurst in 1955, but was given full species status again by Korn et al. in 2006.

Note that for several of these species there are different varieties, some of which have recently been suggested as subspecies and even separate species. T. longicaudatus, for example, may actually be several species lumped together, and T. cancriformis is generally recognized as having three subspecies: T. cancriformis cancriformis,
T. c. mauretanicus, and T. c. simplex. Also, the albino form has the special name of T. cancriformis var. Beni-Kabuto Ebi.

Relationship with humans 
T. longicaudatus is considered a human ally against the West Nile virus, as the individuals consume Culex mosquito larvae. They also are used as a biological pest control in Japan, eating weeds in rice paddies. The Beni-Kabuto Ebi Albino variant of T. cancriformis is particularly valued for this purpose. In Wyoming, the presence of T. longicaudatus usually indicates a good chance of the hatching of spadefoot frogs.

Dried eggs of T. longicaudatus are sold in kits to be raised as aquarium pets, sold under the name of "aquasaurs", "trigons" or "triops". Among enthusiasts, T. cancriformis is also common. Other species often encountered in captivity include T. australiensis, T. newberryi and T. granarius.

Captive Triops are frequently kept in aquaria and fed a diet consisting mainly of carrots, shrimp pellets and dried shrimp. Often they are also given living shrimp and Daphnia as live prey. Because they can feed on just about anything they are also fed lunch meat, crackers, potatoes etc.

In California, T. longicaudatus has emerged as a significant pest of rice cultivation, due to its digging behaviour uprooting young rice seedlings.

References

External links 
 Discussing Triops (r/Triops)—A Reddit community devoted to their care and ecology. 
 Mytriops.com—Website with useful information about Triops and keeping Triops as pets.
 Triops—YouTube video on raising Triops

Notostraca
Branchiopoda genera
Permian crustaceans
Extant Pennsylvanian first appearances
Taxa named by Franz von Paula Schrank
Animals bred for albinism on a large scale